William H. Wilson (c. 1873 – March 27, 1901) was an American politician from New York.

Life
He was born about 1873, in New York City. He attended the public schools, and studied law for some time. Then he became night manager of a taxicab company.

Wilson entered politics as a Democrat, and was appointed as stenographer of the Civil Court in the 8th District. He was a member of the New York State Assembly (New York Co., 9th D.) in 1901.

He died during the legislative session, on March 27, 1901, at his home at 309 West 23rd Street in New York City.

References

1873 births
1901 deaths
People from Manhattan
Democratic Party members of the New York State Assembly
19th-century American politicians